Darrell Wayne Rasner, Jr. (born January 13, 1981) is an American former professional baseball pitcher. He played in Major League Baseball (MLB) for the Washington Nationals and New York Yankees and in Nippon Professional Baseball (NPB) for the Tohoku Rakuten Golden Eagles.

Career

Amateur career
Rasner attended the University of Nevada, Reno, where he played college baseball for the Nevada Wolf Pack. He earned Freshman All-American honors in 2000, with a record of 14-2, 3.52 ERA in 18 appearances. When drafted, he held records for most wins (28) and strikeouts (302) by a Nevada pitcher.  He was a health ecology major. Rasner was selected by the Montreal Expos with the 5th pick in the second round (46th overall) of the 2002 Major League Baseball Draft.

Rasner also has a cousin, Jacob Rasner, who played professional baseball. Jacob was drafted in the 2005 Major League Baseball Draft and played for the AA Birmingham Barons, an affiliate of the Chicago White Sox.

Professional career
Rasner began his major league career with the Washington Nationals, pitching in a few games late in the  season. He was claimed off waivers by the New York Yankees on February 11, 2006.

Rasner recorded his first major league win on September 3, in a game he started for the Yankees against the Minnesota Twins. Rasner went six innings, allowing four hits, one earned run, two strikeouts and no walks in a 10-1 victory.

On May 19, in a start against the New York Mets, Rasner was struck on the right hand by a ball hit by Endy Chávez, a former teammate with the Nationals. He fractured his right index finger and did not pitch in the major leagues again that season, though he pitched at several levels of the minor leagues on rehab assignments.

Rasner was not offered a new contract by the Yankees and became a free agent on December 12, 2007, but was re-signed a few days later on December 18 to a minor league deal.

On May 4, Rasner was recalled by the Yankees, and made his season debut against the Seattle Mariners.  Rasner worked six innings, allowing only two runs and stayed in the Yankee rotation until September, when he was replaced by Alfredo Aceves.

Japanese career
On November 15, 2008, the Yankees sold Rasner to the Tohoku Rakuten Golden Eagles for $1 million. Rasner signed a two-year deal with the Golden Eagles. He played with the Golden Eagles for five years (2009-2013), the last three as a closer and setup man. He won the Japanese series championship as a member of the Rakuten Golden Eagles with former Yankees Andruw Jones, Casey McGehee and future Yankee Masahiro Tanaka who would sign with the New York Yankees in the 2013 offseason. After finishing his playing career, he would become an international scout for the Eagles.

References

External links

1981 births
Living people
Baseball players from Nevada
Major League Baseball pitchers
Vermont Expos players
Savannah Sand Gnats players
Brevard County Manatees players
Harrisburg Senators players
Gulf Coast Yankees players
Tampa Yankees players
Columbus Clippers players
Staten Island Yankees players
Scranton/Wilkes-Barre Yankees players
Washington Nationals players
New York Yankees players
American expatriate baseball players in Japan
Nippon Professional Baseball pitchers
Tohoku Rakuten Golden Eagles players
Politicians from Carson City, Nevada
Nevada Wolf Pack baseball players